The 2007–08 Hoofdklasse season was competed in six leagues, three Saturday leagues and three Sunday leagues. The champions of the three Saturday Hoofdklasse leagues will face each other after the regular season for the Dutch national Saturday amateur football title, the champions of the three Sunday leagues will face each other after the regular season for the national Sunday amateur football title. The Saturday and Sunday champions will then face each other for the national amateur football title.

Final league standings

Saturday

Saturday Hoofdklasse A

Saturday Hoofdklasse B

Saturday Hoofdklasse C

Sunday

Sunday Hoofdklasse A

Sunday Hoofdklasse B

Sunday Hoofdklasse C

National title

National Saturday title

National Sunday title

National title

References

Vierde Divisie seasons
Neth
4